John Crighton Bramwell  (1889–1976) was a British cardiologist, professor of medicine, and one of the founders of cardiology as a specialist subject in the UK.

Education and career
After education at Cheltenham College, J. Crighton Bramwell matriculated in 1907 at Trinity College, Cambridge, graduating BA in 1910. There he was influenced by the physiologist Keith Lucas. In 1911 Bramwell started clinical medical training at the Manchester Royal Infirmary. At the start of WWI he joined the 1st East Lancashire Territorial Field Ambulance in Egypt. In 1915 he was granted leave for two months to take his final examination at the University of Manchester, where he graduated MB CHB. After his return to active duty, he was posted to the 23rd Division, 12th Army Corps in France and then in Italy as part of the Italian Expeditionary Force. He served first with a Field Ambulance and later as Deputy Assistant Director of Medical Services (DADMS) to GHQ, Italy.

At the Manchester Royal Infirmary, Bramwell became in 1919 a house physician under G. R. Murray and a medical and cardiographic registrar. At the University of Manchester in 1920 Bramwell was put in charge of the newly established electrocardiographic department. At the University of Manchester's department of physiology from 1919 to 1923 Bramwell collaborated with Archibald Hill on several papers on pulse wave velocity and arterial elasticity and taught clinical medicine.

In 1923 Bramwell graduated MD from the University of Manchester and was elected one of the first four Rockefeller Travelling Fellows of the Medical Research Council. From 1923 to 1925 he worked at Washington University in St. Louis and the Rockefeller Institute of Medical Research in Manhattan and also visited about 18 of the leading medical schools in the United States and Canada.

He was appointed in 1925 an assistant lecturer in experimental physiology at the University of Manchester. He was appointed in 1926 a physician at the Manchester Royal Infirmary and later entered consulting practice as a cardiologist. From 1940 to 1946 he was part-time Professor of Systematic Medicine in the University of Manchester. In 1946 he resigned that professorship so that Robert Platt could become full-time professor of medicine. From 1946 to 1954 Bramwell was professor of cardiology and then retired as professor emeritus.

He was elected FRCP in 1929 and honorary FRCP (Edin.) in 1960. He gave in 1937 the Lumleian Lectures on Arterial pulse in health and disease and in 1956 the Harveian Oration on Practice, teaching and research. For many years he was an editor for the Quarterly Journal of Medicine. He was in 1955–1956 the president of the Association of Physicians and the president of the British Cardiac Society. He was for many years a member of the editorial board of the British Heart Journal, which in 1956 dedicated a special issue to him. In that issue, J. Maurice Campbell wrote an appreciation of Bramwell's contributions to cardiology.

Family
J. Crighton Bramwell's father Byrom Bramwell and eldest brother Edwin Bramwell were elected FRCP. In 1929 Crighton Bramwell married Elsa Violet Risk. Her father James Risk was a whisky distiller, who owned the Bankier Distillery in Banknock, Scotland. Crighton and Elsa Bramwell had two sons, one of whom became a physician, and one daughter, who worked in medical publishing.

Selected publications
with Keith Lucas: 

with A. Morgan Jones: 
with A. Morgan Jones: 

with A. Morgan Jones: 

 (See John Hay.)

References

External links

1889 births
1976 deaths
20th-century British medical doctors
People educated at Cheltenham College
Alumni of Trinity College, Cambridge
Alumni of the University of Manchester
Academics of the University of Manchester
British cardiologists
Fellows of the Royal College of Physicians
Royal Army Medical Corps officers